Mikaszówka Lock - the eleventh lock on the Augustów Canal (from the Biebrza). Located near the village Mikaszówka. Built in 1828 by Lt. Eng. Wojciech Korczakowski.
 Location: 69.1 km channel
 Level difference: 2.44 m
 Length: 43.31 m
 Width: 6.05 m
 Gates: Wooden
 Year built: 1828
 Construction Manager: Wojciech Korczakowski

References

 
 
 

19th-century establishments in Poland
Mikaszówka
Augustów County